Deepak Shivdasani is an Indian film director and producer of Bollywood. He made Ladaai with Aditya Pancholi and Mithun Chakraborty in 1989, Baaghi: A Rebel for Love with Salman Khan in 1990 and Bhai Gopi Kishan, Krishna and Pehchaan with Sunil Shetty in 1997.

Selected filmography

1982 - Bezubaan (Asst. Dir)
1983 - Woh Saat Din (Asst. Dir)
1985 - Bhavani Junction
1987 - Dadagiri
1989 - Ladaai 
1990 - Baaghi: A Rebel for Love
1993 - Pehchaan. 
1994 - Madam X
1996 - Krishna
1997 - Bhai
2001 - Yeh Raaste Hain Pyaar Ke
2004 - Julie
2008 - Mr. Black Mr. White
2017 - Julie 2

References

External links

Living people
Film directors from Mumbai
Hindi-language film directors
20th-century Indian film directors
21st-century Indian film directors
Year of birth missing (living people)